The  occurred on 28 January 1868 during the Boshin War in Japan, in the area of Awa Bay near Osaka. Involving ships of the Tokugawa shogunate and Satsuma vessels loyal to the imperial court in Kyoto, the battle was the second naval battle in Japanese history between modern naval forces (after the 1863 Battle of Shimonoseki Straits). Enomoto Takeaki led the shogunal navy to victory at Awa, in one of the few Tokugawa successes of the Boshin War, one day after the start of the land Battle of Toba–Fushimi (which the shogunate lost to the Imperial forces).

Summary
The shogunal navy under Enomoto Takeaki was nearby with the steam frigate Kaiyō Maru as its main unit, and had been supporting the Battle of Toba–Fushimi from the sea. Enomoto's fleet moved to blockade the withdrawal of the Satsuma ships.

On 28 January, in the early morning, the Satsuma ships left Hyōgo harbor. Heiun left through the Strait of Akashi, and Kasuga went south with Shōō towards the Kitan Strait. Kaiyō Maru pursued and prepared for combat. At a distance of 1,200–2,500 meters, Kaiyō Maru fired about 25 times on the two Satsuma ships, and Kasuga responded with 18 shots, without significant damage to either side. However, as more Shogunate navy ships had arrived (the Banryū and Shokaku), Kasuga broke off the engagement, and, being faster than Kaiyō Maru, escaped to Kagoshima. Looking at the burning Shōō, Enomoto expressed admiration at the fight put on by his enemies: .

The future Imperial Japanese Navy Fleet Admiral Tōgō Heihachirō was a gunner aboard Kasuga during the engagement.

References

Awa 1868
1868 in Japan
Awa
January 1868 events